Mnarani ruins (Swahili Magofu ya Mnarani) is a Swahili historic site located in Tanga Region, Tanzania.It is home to Medieval Swahili ruins that have yet to be excavated.

See also
Historic Swahili Settlements
National Historic Sites in Tanzania
Swahili architecture

References

Swahili people
Swahili city-states
Swahili culture
Tanga, Tanzania
Geography of Tanga Region
National Historic Sites in Tanga Region
National Historic Sites in Tanzania
Archaeological sites in Tanzania